Nguyễn Thùy Lâm (Her real name is Nguyễn Thùy Trang, born September 10, 1987 in Thái Bình, Vietnam) is a Vietnamese singer and actress, and was the winner of the Miss Universe Vietnam 2008 contest on May 31, 2008. Thuy Lam represented Vietnam in the Miss Universe 2008 competition and was the first Vietnamese contestant that made it to the semifinals of Miss Universe.

Miss Universe Vietnam 2008
Thuy Lam was announced winner of Miss Vietnam 2008 on May 31, 2008. During the competition she was awarded Miss Talent and Miss Internet by the audience. As the winner, she was also awarded $US12,000 and won the right to represent Vietnam at the Miss Universe 2008 competition.

Miss Universe 2008
At the competition held in multiple cities in Vietnam, Thuy Lam was a Top 10 finalist in the Best National Costume competition and Top 5 finalist in the Most Charming in Áo Dài (Áo Dài fashion show). In the final competition, Thuy Lam became the first Vietnamese candidate to survive the first cut in Miss Universe pageant being only one of the two Asians making the first cut along with Hiroko Mima of Japan. She was consequently cut when the Top 10 candidates were announced.

Personal life
She is married to a businessman graduated from US, Nguyễn Anh Tuấn.

See also
Miss Vietnam
Miss World Vietnamese
Miss Universe Vietnam

References

External links
Áo dài Bình Dương
Fanclub

1987 births
Living people
Miss Universe 2008 contestants
Vietnamese actresses
21st-century Vietnamese women singers
People from Thái Bình province
Vietnamese beauty pageant winners